Mel Martin (Melanie Jayne "Mel" Martin) (born 1947) is an English actor.

Mel Martin may also refer to:

Mel Martin (car collector), founder of the Martin Auto Museum
Mel Martin, saxophonist-flautist who has recorded with Kenny Barron
Melvin Martin, winner of the 1991 American Pool Checker Championship
Melvin Martin, American guitarist who played with Rob Cooper in the 1930s

Martin, Mel